Lacadiera (minor planet designation: 336 Lacadiera) is a large Main belt asteroid. It is classified as a D-type asteroid and is probably composed of organic rich silicates, carbon and anhydrous silicates.  The asteroid was discovered by Auguste Charlois on 19 September 1892 in Nice.

In 2000, the asteroid was detected by radar from the Arecibo Observatory at a distance of 1.21 AU.

References

External links 
 
 

000336
Discoveries by Auguste Charlois
Named minor planets
000336
000336
18920919